Vajiralongkorn Dam, also called the Khao Laem Dam, is a concrete-faced rock-fill dam (CFRD) in Thong Pha Phum District in Kanchanaburi, Thailand. The dam lies across the Khwae Noi River (River Kwai) and was renamed Vajiralongkorn Dam after King Vajiralongkorn on 13 July 2001 when he was crown prince. Vajiralongkorn Dam is Thailand's first CFRD and supplies a 300 MW hydroelectric power station with water. The dam was built and is managed by the Electricity Generating Authority of Thailand (EGAT).

Construction
Dam construction began in 1979 and took five years to complete. Its reservoir started filling with water in June, 1984. Three 100MW hydropower generators came on line in October and December 1984 and February 1985 respectively. The reservoir created by the dam has a maximum storage capacity of 8,860 million m3 inundating 388 square km2. Average runoff into the reservoir is approximately 5,500 million m3 per year.

See also

List of power stations in Thailand
Srinagarind Dam – downstream

References

External links

Dams in Thailand
Hydroelectric power stations in Thailand
Concrete-face rock-fill dams
Buildings and structures in Kanchanaburi province
Dams completed in 1984
Energy infrastructure completed in 1984
1984 establishments in Thailand